Rubidimonas crustatorum  is a Gram-negative, aerobic, rod-shaped and non-motile bacterium from the genus of Rubidimonas which has been isolated from Squillidae from the Ariake Sea near Nagasaki on Japan.

References 

Sphingobacteriia
Bacteria described in 2012